The Christchurch North by-election of 1889 was a by-election held to elect a member to the New Zealand House of Representatives' 10th session. It was held to fill the gap left by Sir Julius Vogel, the former Premier of New Zealand, by resigning from the  electorate.

Samuel Charles Jolly, who in  had contested , was one of the candidates campaigning for election, but after he was poorly received at public meetings did not proceed to nomination.

The election was held on 19 June 1889 and the official result was released the following day at noon, declaring Edward Humphreys as the elected representative.

References

By-elections in New Zealand
1889 elections in New Zealand
Politics of Christchurch